Ruslan Viktorovych Fedotenko (born 18 January 1979) is a Ukrainian former professional ice hockey winger.

A two-time Stanley Cup champion, in his National Hockey League (NHL) career he played for the Philadelphia Flyers, Tampa Bay Lightning, New York Islanders, Pittsburgh Penguins and the New York Rangers.  Internationally, Fedotenko has competed for Ukraine in the 2002 Winter Olympics.

Playing career

Start in the NHL 

As a youth, Fedotenko played in the 1993 Quebec International Pee-Wee Hockey Tournament with a team from Ukraine.

Fedotenko went undrafted and first entered the NHL after being signed by the Philadelphia Flyers in 1999. He scored the overtime winning goal in Game 1 of the 2002 Eastern Conference Quarter-Finals against the Ottawa Senators during the 2002 Stanley Cup Playoffs.

Tampa Bay Lightning and first Stanley Cup win 
After two seasons with the Flyers, he was traded in 2002 to the Tampa Bay Lightning, along with two second round draft picks, in exchange for Tampa Bay's first round draft pick, which was used to draft Joni Pitkänen.

In 2004, Fedotenko won his first Stanley Cup, scoring both Lightning goals in Game 7 of the Finals against the Calgary Flames.  It was Tampa Bay's first Stanley Cup in franchise history. After a career-high 26-goal, 41-point campaign in 2005–06, Fedotenko was re-signed as a restricted free agent in July 2006 to a one-year contract worth $1.65 million.

New York Islanders 
Following his fourth season in Tampa Bay, Fedotenko signed a one-year, $2.9 million contract with the New York Islanders in July 2007, joining Mike Comrie and Bill Guerin as the Islanders' free agent acquisitions. He scored 33 points in his first and only season with the Islanders.

Pittsburgh Penguins and second Stanley Cup win 
The following off-season, Fedotenko signed his third consecutive one-year contract, a $2.25 million deal with Pittsburgh Penguins in July 2008.  Fedotenko neared career-high totals with 39 points in 65 games, benefiting as a winger on a talented Penguins team that featured centers Sidney Crosby, Evgeni Malkin and Jordan Staal.  He went on to tally 14 points in 24 post-season games with the Penguins in 2009, capturing his second career Stanley Cup as Pittsburgh defeated the Detroit Red Wings in seven games. After becoming an unrestricted free agent in July 2009, Fedotenko took a pay cut and agreed to a one-year, $1.8 million contract to remain with the Penguins.

New York Rangers 
On 10 September 2010, Fedotenko accepted a try-out with the New York Rangers. After an impressive preseason, the Rangers signed Fedotenko to a one-year $1 million deal on 4 October 2010.

On 1 July 2011, Fedotenko re-signed with the New York Rangers, accepting a one-year, $1.4 million contract.

Return to the Flyers 
On 5 July 2012, Fedotenko returned to where his NHL career began and signed a one-year deal with the Philadelphia Flyers for $1.75 million. During the 2012–13 NHL lockout, Fedotenko played for the Kontinental Hockey League's HC Donbass. Following the 2012–13 NHL season, Fedotenko signed a three-year, $9 million contract with Donbass.

Later career and retirement 
On 20 January 2015, Fedotenko signed a professional try out contract with the Iowa Wild. To end the 2014–15 season, Fedotenko registered 3 goals in 13 games with Iowa.  On 1 July 2015, Fedotenko signed as a free agent to a one-year contract with Iowa's parent affiliate, the Minnesota Wild.

On 11 October 2016, Fedotenko announced his retirement from professional hockey. Fedotenko finished his career as a two-time Stanley Cup Champion, played in a total of 863 NHL games with five different NHL teams, scored 173 goals and registered 193 assists, totaling 366 points.

International play
Fedotenko has played internationally for the Ukrainian national ice hockey team, appearing in one game for his nation at the 2002 Winter Olympics in a 5–2 defeat of Switzerland.

Career statistics

Regular season and playoffs

International

Personal life
Fedotenko has a tattoo of 2 Stanley Cups on his shoulder. Fedotenko resides in Tampa, Florida, with his wife Debbie and three stepsons.

References

External links

 

1979 births
HC Donbass players
Ice hockey players at the 2002 Winter Olympics
Iowa Wild players
Living people
Melfort Mustangs players
New York Islanders players
New York Rangers players
Olympic ice hockey players of Ukraine
Sportspeople from Kyiv
Philadelphia Flyers players
Philadelphia Phantoms players
Pittsburgh Penguins players
Sioux City Musketeers players
Sokil Kyiv players
Stanley Cup champions
Tampa Bay Lightning players
Trenton Titans players
Ukrainian emigrants to the United States
Ukrainian expatriate sportspeople in the United States
Ukrainian ice hockey left wingers
Undrafted National Hockey League players